Vertical is a 1967 Soviet sports drama film directed by Stanislav Govorukhin and Boris Durov. With 32.8 million viewers it became one of the 1967 Soviet box office leaders (10th place among the Soviet-produced movies and 13th place it total). The film was a directorial debut for both Govorukhin and Durov. It was also the first movie where Vladimir Vysotsky worked as a composer and songwriter. His songs became extremely popular, they were immediately released on the extended play and gave a start to his musical career.

Plot 
The group of climbers led by an experienced Vitali Leonov went to Svaneti to conquer Mount Hor-Tau (fictional peak). Four go to the top and the bottom, in the camp, are radio operator Vladimir  and physician Larisa. Volodya receives a message regarding an incoming storm and passes it to the group, but one of the climbers hides this important information from his comrades. The climbers reach the top, but on the way back down they are caught in a snow storm. The conquerors face a difficult way back to base camp.

Cast
Vladimir Vysotsky - Volodya
Larisa Luzhina - Larissa
Georgiy Kulbush - Vitaly Lomov, expedition leader
Gennady Voropayev - Gennady
Margarita Kosheleva - Rita
Alexander Fadeev - Sasha Nikitin
Bukhuti Zakariadze - Vissarion
 M. Anuchrinov		
 L. Gliseyev		
 L. Kakhilin	
 Sh. Mareklin

Production

The script
According to the memoirs of Sergei Tarasov, the script was based on the story of his brother-in-law Vladimir Kopalin, who climbed Lenin Peak in 1965: "I had a story not about people climbing mountains, but about an unknown soldier, so to speak, who did the most difficult work in the mountains to prove that he was not to blame in the tragedy that happened on the last ascent." Tarasov was not inspired by the footage, but after meeting Vysotsky, the screenwriter decided that with his ballads, "both meaning and clarity" would appear in the film. The working title of the script was "Possessed".

Filming
The film was shot in the Elbrus region in July-December, 1966 in black and white. In order for the actors to be able to play climbers qualitatively, special training was conducted for them: they mastered the ice axe, lived in tents, learned to walk as a rope team, climbed to a height of 3000 meters and passed all climbing standards. After the filming was completed, the actors received badges "Climber of the USSR".

Vladimir Vysotsky was invited to play a radio operator after Yuri Vizbor refused to shoot. Vysotsky was bribed by the opportunity to become a singer-songwriter for the film.

References

External links
 
 Encyclopedia of Russian cinema

1967 films
1960s action drama films
Soviet action drama films
Climbing films
Soviet sports drama films
1967 directorial debut films
Films directed by Stanislav Govorukhin
Films directed by Boris Durov
Vladimir Vysotsky
1960s sports drama films